M.I.L.K. (acronym for Made In Lovely Kin) was a South Korean girl group formed by SM Entertainment's sister label, BM Entertainment, in 2001. The group debuted on December 17, 2001 with the full album With Freshness. In 2003, Bae Yu-mi departed from the group, which led to its disbandment. The members transitioned to solo acting careers.

Background
It took two years for the group to be formed. The group debuted with their first album With Freshness on December 17, 2001. The group was managed under BM entertainment, and fan club was called "Milky Way". "Into the New World" was expected to be the title song for their planned second album but was cancelled and instead went to Girls' Generation.

Past members
 Park Hee-von
 Kim Bo-mi
 Bae Yu-mi
 Seo Hyun-jin

Discography

Studio albums

The album was produced by Moon Hee-joon.It was the earliest works the producing team Sweetune participated in.

Singles

Collaborations
2001 Winter Vacation in SM Town - Angel Eyes 
 Track 1: Angel Eyes - SMTown
 Track 16: Wait For Me
2002 Summer Vacation in SM Town - Summer Vacation 
 Track 3: Summer Vacation - SMTown
 Track 10: One Summer Dream
2002 Winter Vacation in SM Town - My Angel, My Light
 CD 1, Track 1: My Angel, My Light - SMTown 
 CD 1, Track 4: Snow in My Mind with Shoo, BoA
 CD 2, Track 1 Dear My Family - SMTown
2003 Summer Vacation in SM Town - Hello! Summer! 
 Track 1: Hello Summer - SMTown
 Track 2: Paradise – Fly to the Sky, Lee Ji-hoon, Ji-yeon, Seo Hyun-jin
 Track 5: Summer In Dream – Moon Hee-jun, Shoo, BoA, Jae-won, Seo Hyun-jin, Park Hee-von)
 Track 10: 그림으로 떠나는 여행 – Kangta, Dana, Lee Ji-hoon, Park Hee-von, Ji-yeon
2004 Summer Vacation in SM Town - Hot Mail
 Track 1: Hot Mail (여름편지) – SMTown
2006 Summer Vacation in SM Town - Red Sun 
 Track 1: 태양은 가득히 (Red Sun) – SMTown
 Track 8: Raindrops (Seo Hyun-jin only)
2006 Winter Vacation in SM Town - Snow Dream
 Track 1: Snow Dream - SMTown
 Track 11: 눈의 이야기 (Winter of Memories) (Seo Hyun-jin only)
2007 Winter SMTown – Only Love
 Track 1: 사랑 하나죠 (Only Love) - SMTown
 Track 8: Have Yourself a Merry Little Christmas (Seo Hyun-jin only)
SM Best Album 3
 CD 1, Track 8: Come To Me

Awards

References 

K-pop music groups
Musical groups disestablished in 2003
Musical groups established in 2001
SM Town
South Korean girl groups
SM Entertainment artists
2001 establishments in South Korea
2003 disestablishments in South Korea